He Liping (born November 13, 1972) is a female Chinese softball player who competed in the 1996 Summer Olympics.

In 1996 she won the silver medal as part of the Chinese team. She played one game as a pitcher.

External links
profile

1972 births
Living people
Chinese softball players
Olympic silver medalists for China
Olympic softball players of China
Softball players at the 1996 Summer Olympics
Olympic medalists in softball

Medalists at the 1996 Summer Olympics